End of (the) night may refer to:

 Dawn, the beginning of morning twilight

Arts and media

Films
 Nishant (film) (English: Night's End), a 1975 Hindi film directed by Shyam Benegal
 The End of the Night, a 1989 Italian film directed by Davide Ferrario
 At the End of the Night, a 2003 Italian film directed by Salvatore Piscicelli

Literature
 The End of Night (book), 2013 book by Paul Bogard

Songs
 "End of the Night", a 1967 song by The Doors
 "End of Night" (song), a 2013 song by Dido

Television
 "End of Nights", an episode of the television series Sanctuary

Other uses
 Nishant (name), a common Indian male given name, literally meaning "end of night"

See also
 Journey to the End of the Night (disambiguation)